This is a list of films produced in Albania during the 1950s.

Films
 Skënderbeu (1953)
 Fëmijët e saj (1957)
 Tana (1958)
 Furtuna (1959)

References

Lists of Albanian films